The 1956 Sagaing earthquake occurred on July 16, 1956, at 15:07 UTC. The earthquake was located near Sagaing, Burma. This earthquake had a magnitude of  7.1.

Thirty-eight people died because of the earthquake. Several pagodas, including the Mingun Pagoda, were severely damaged. The earthquake was close to the Shan-Sagaing Fault. However, the focal mechanism remains undetermined. The intensity reached MM VIII to MM IX near the epicenter.

See also
List of earthquakes in 1956
List of earthquakes in Myanmar

References

External links

Sagaing earthquake, 1956
Earthquakes in Myanmar
Strike-slip earthquakes
1956 in Burma